The International Federation of American Football (IFAF) is the international governing body of gridiron associations. The IFAF oversees the IFAF World Championship of American Football, which is held every four years. The IFAF became a provisionary member of SportAccord in 2003, and became a full SportAccord member in 2005. The organisation's head office is located in the French commune of La Courneuve, in the Île-de-France region.

Structure and organization
The IFAF recognizes in their respective areas the following branches and have 120 members as of May 2022:

 IFAF Africa : 17
 IFAF Americas : 23
 IFAF Asia : 30
 IFAF Europe : 42 (European Championship of American football)
 IFAF Oceania : 8

Members

Top competitions

World
 Senior Men's World Championship (Men), every four years.
 Senior Women's World Championship (Women), every four years.
 Under-19 World Championship (Men), every four years.
 Senior Men's Flag Football World Championship (Men), every two years.
 Senior Women's Flag Football World Championship (Women), every two years
 Senior Beach Football World Championship (Women, Men and Mixed), every two years.
 World University American Football Championship (Men), every two years.
International Bowl (men), every year.
The World Games, flag and tackle, various years, next event in 2022.
Youth international cup (Men, Women), every year.
Olympic Games (Men), various years.

America
Central America Bowl, (Men). Winner qualifies for the Senior World championship. Every four years.
Under-18 and Under-19 North American Championships, various years.
Under-15 and Under-17 North American Flag football Championships. (Men and Woman), first edition held in 2023
South American Flag football Championships. (Men and Woman). Every two years.

Europe
European Championship, every four years.
European U-19 Championship, every two years.
European Woman's tackle football championship, every four years.
European Men's flag football championship, every two years.
European Woman's flag football championship, every two years.
Under-15 and Under-17 European Flag football championships (Men and Women), every two years.

Asia
Asian Flag football Championship (Men), every two years.
Asian beach Flag football championships. (Men), every two years.

Oceania
Oceania Bowl, winner represents Oceania in the World Championship, every four years.
Junior Oceania Bowl, winner represents Oceania in the U-19 World Championship, every two years.

Governance controversy and schism 
Following the cancellation of the 2015 IFAF World Championship in Sweden for financial reasons, the event was moved to the United States. In February 2015 Tommy Wiking resigned as president of IFAF due to the cancellation of the event. During the 2015 meeting, Tommy Wiking was illegitimately put as president, and caused a schism. One group, in New York, elected Roope Norenen as interim president in September 2014, and Richard MacLean in 2015. The other group, based in Paris, recognized Tommy Wiking as president.

In September 2016, "IFAF in Paris" suspended six nations for not submitting players information for anti-doping, The suspended nations were the United States, Japan, Canada, Mexico, Finland, and Denmark. A group of European federations wished for a reunification of the sport during a December 2016 meeting in Rome. In May 2017, after a split that created rival groupings of the International Federation of American Football, the IFAF grouping based in Paris stripped its recognition of USA Football, citing disputes over anti-doping enforcement. IFAF (Paris) instead recognized the United States Federation of American Football as the USA's governing body, and the USFAF organized a team to participate in the 2017 World Games, in which it won a bronze medal. The grouping of the IFAF based in New York continued to recognize USA Football and organized the 2017 Women's World Championships, which the USA won.

In March 2018, the Court of Arbitration for Sport (CAS) determined that the IFAF (NY) was the proper governing entity and voided all decisions of the other IFAF entity, including their decision to strip USA Football of its recognition. USA Football is currently the internationally recognized governing body for American football in the United States.

See also

 List of American and Canadian football leagues
 NFL Europe
 IFAF Flag Football World Championship
 IFAF Junior World Championship

References

External links 

 
Sports organizations established in 1998
American football governing bodies
IOC-recognised international federations
1998 establishments in France